Luis Fernando Martínez Izquierdo (born September 1, 1998, in EdoMex) is a retired amateur Mexican Greco-Roman wrestler, who competed in the men's welterweight category. He has claimed two bronze medals in the 69 and 66-kg division at the Pan American Games (1999 and 2003), and also represented Colombia at the 2004 Summer Olympics. Izquierdo is also a member of Jaime Lozada Wrestling Club in his native Cali, under his personal coach and father Jesus Benito Izquierdo.

Izquierdo qualified as a lone wrestler for the Colombian squad in the men's 66 kg class at the 2004 Summer Olympics in Athens. Earlier in the process, he received a berth and rounded out the ninth spot in his respective category from the 2003 World Wrestling Championships in Créteil, France. He lost two straight matches each to Ukraine's Armen Vardanyan and Turkey's Şeref Eroğlu, both on technical superiority, but sailed smoothly with an easy victory over Georgia's Manuchar Kvirkvelia, who was immediately disqualified for infringing the rules of the tournament. Placing third in the prelim pool and twelfth overall, Izquierdo failed to advance to the quarterfinals. As two wrestlers were both disqualified by a forfeit in the fifth-place match, Izquierdo's position was upgraded to tenth.

References

External links
 

1974 births
Living people
Colombian male sport wrestlers
Olympic wrestlers of Colombia
Wrestlers at the 2004 Summer Olympics
Wrestlers at the 1999 Pan American Games
Wrestlers at the 2003 Pan American Games
Pan American Games bronze medalists for Colombia
Sportspeople from Cali
Pan American Games medalists in wrestling
Medalists at the 1999 Pan American Games